Scoundrel: How a Convicted Murderer Persuaded the Women Who Loved Him, the Conservative Establishment, and the Courts to Set Him Free is a 2022 book by Sarah Weinman that examines the life of Edgar Smith. The book has three "positive" reviews and nine "rave" reviews, according to review aggregator Book Marks.

References

2022 non-fiction books
English-language books
Ecco Press books